Iroquois Park is a 725-acre (3.0 km²) municipal park in Louisville, Kentucky, United States. It was designed by Frederick Law Olmsted, who also designed Louisville's Cherokee Park and Shawnee Park, at what were then the edges of the city. Located south of downtown, Iroquois Park was promoted as "Louisville's Yellowstone". It is built on a large knob covered with old growth forest, and its most prominent feature are the scenic viewpoints atop the hill.

The summit of Iroquois Park presents an all-at-once vista of the city of Louisville, seen from the south. A bronze plaque at the site demonstrates the plan of the city's park and parkway system as planned and executed by Olmsted's firm.

The park features an amphitheater, basketball courts, 18-hole golf course, a disc golf course and a riding stable. Louisville Metro Parks and partner companies stage concerts, musicals, and other shows each summer at Iroquois Amphitheater.

History
Iroquois Park was one of the three major suburban parks created in the late 19th century in Louisville. In 1889, Mayor Charles Donald Jacob purchased Burnt Knob, a 313-acre (1.3 km²) tract of land 4 miles (6 km) south of the city, for $9,000, and was reimbursed by the city treasurer without approval from the city council or public referendum, meaning the original purchase was probably illegal. Jacob also negotiated with landowners between the city and the then-rural park to acquire the right of way for a 150-foot (46 m) wide "Grand Boulevard", today's Southern Parkway, which still leads to the park.

The move was controversial at first and called "Jacob's Folly" by political opponents after early improvements were washed away by rain in the Spring of 1889. In 1890 control over the park, then called Jacob's Park, was given to the Board of Park Commissioners. Frederick Law Olmsted was invited to tour the park, and gave an influential speech at the Pendennis Club on May 20, 1891, and signed a contract to design the city's park system two days later. Work was soon underway on the park, by then renamed Iroquois, which Olmsted envisioned as "providing the grandeur of the forest depths in the dim seclusion of which you may wander musingly for hours".

See also
Performing arts in Louisville, Kentucky
Iroquois, Louisville
Kenwood Hill
Little Loomhouse
Colonial Gardens
City of Parks
History of Louisville, Kentucky
List of attractions and events in the Louisville metropolitan area
List of parks in the Louisville metropolitan area

References

Further reading

External links

Iroquois Amphitheater
Iroquois Park — The Cultural Landscape Foundation
Satellite image of Iroquois Park
   Images of Iroquois Park (Louisville, Ky.) in the University of Louisville Libraries Digital Collections

Parks in Louisville, Kentucky
Arts venues in Louisville, Kentucky
Frederick Law Olmsted works
Protected areas established in 1889
1889 establishments in Kentucky
Golf clubs and courses in Kentucky
Landforms of Louisville, Kentucky
Hills of Kentucky